Creve Coeur Lake Memorial Park (also called Creve Coeur County Park) is a  St. Louis County park located in Maryland Heights, Missouri, United States. The park is the largest in the St. Louis County Parks system and includes Creve Coeur Lake, an oxbow lake which is one of the largest natural lakes in Missouri. The park has facilities for picnicking, tennis courts, multi-purpose athletic fields, and an archery course. Creve Coeur Park includes Crystal Springs Quarry Golf Course, an 18-hole course opened in 2001. In December 2003, construction for the Creve Coeur Lake Memorial Park Bridge, which is part of Missouri Route 364, was completed. The concrete bridge connects St. Louis County to St. Charles County and crosses over the southern end of the park. The project also included Creve Coeur Lake being dredged and the addition of a siltation lake to prevent the need for later dredging. Creve Coeur Lake Memorial Park has an asphalt walking trail around the lake, which was constructed by the Missouri Department of Transportation alongside the bridge project. The trail also connects to a separate lane on the bridge leading across the Missouri River to connect to the Katy Trail. A large portion of the park and surrounding area is also wetlands, and the park has been used for conservation purposes, particularly the study of various waterfowl.

History
The park was the first in the St. Louis County Park system and was dedicated in 1945. In June 1882, the Mississippi Valley regatta was held at the lake. It also hosted the Creve Coeur Regatta and the Annual Races of the National Association of Amateur Oarsmen in 1904 (the rowing competition for the 1904 Summer Olympics), and it was the site where local sculler Jacob Gaudaur often competed, including his victory over John Teemer in a sculling match in 1884. Gaudaur was married to a resident of Creve Coeur, Cora Coons. A smaller,  lake, called Mallard Lake, was constructed with the bridge project.

References

 

Venues of the 1904 Summer Olympics
Olympic rowing venues
Parks in St. Louis
Tourist attractions in St. Louis
1945 establishments in Missouri